KPBM (95.3 FM) was an American radio station broadcasting a Spanish music format. Licensed to serve McCamey, Texas, United States, the station was owned by Paulino Bernal. KPBM's license was cancelled on June 26, 2013.

References

External links
 

PBM
Defunct radio stations in the United States
Radio stations disestablished in 2013
Defunct religious radio stations in the United States
PBM
2013 disestablishments in Texas
PBM